Amola-Faca River or Rio Amola-Faca or Rio do Amola-Faca may refer to the following rivers in Santa Catarina, Brazil:   

 Amola-Faca River (Caveiras River tributary)
 Amola-Faca River (Itoupava River tributary)